is a railway station on the Chikuhō Main Line (on the section also known as the Wakamatsu Line) in Yahatanishi-ku, Kitakyushu, Fukuoka Prefecture, Fukuoka Prefecture, Japan.

Lines

Station layout 
The station consists of an island platform serving two tracks. The station building is a hashigami structure where the passenger facilities (a waiting room, automatic ticket vending machines and ticket gates) are located on the second level on a bridge which links to the platform. The bridge also serves as a pedestrian crossing, linking the streets on both sides of the tracks. Access to the second level of the hashigami structure is by flights of steps or elevators. A bike shed is provided outside the station.

Station layout

History 
The station was opened by JR Kyushu on 15 March 2003 as an additional station on the existing Chikuhō Main Line track.

On 4 March 2017, Honjō, along with several other stations on the line, became a remotely managed "Smart Support Station".

Passenger statistics
In fiscal 2016, the station was used by an average of 1,290 passengers daily (boarding passengers only), and it ranked 134th among the busiest stations of JR Kyushu.

Surrounding area
The station is surrounded by city-owned danchi apartment blocks. National Route 199 lies immediately northwest of the station. Other points of interest include:
 Honjō Athletic Stadium - 2 km northeast 
 University of Occupational and Environmental Health Japan - 1 km northwest
 Kitakyushu Science and Research Park - 3 km north

The nearest bus stops for Kitakyushu City Buses are each approximately 500 meters from the north exit.
, located northeast of the station
, located southwest of the station

There is also a taxi stand outside the station's north exit.

References

External links
Honjō (JR Kyushu)

Railway stations in Japan opened in 2003
Railway stations in Fukuoka Prefecture
Buildings and structures in Kitakyushu